The Freud Museum in London is a museum dedicated to Sigmund Freud.

Freud Museum may also refer to:

Sigmund Freud Museum (Vienna), Austria
Sigmund Freud Museum in his former family home in Příbor, Czech Republic

See also
Sigmund Freud